Nagarkurnool district  is a district in the southern region of the Indian state of Telangana. The town of Nagarkurnool is the district headquarters. It was part of the Mahbubnagar district prior to re-organisation of districts in the state. The district shares boundaries with Nalgonda, Rangareddy, Mahabubnagar, Wanaparthy districts and with the state boundary of Andhra Pradesh with Nandyal, Palnadu and Prakasam Districts.

History  
The Nagarkurnool district is historically, traditionally ruled by several empires in past. The evidences of monuments and inscriptions found near confluence of rivers Krishna River and Tungabhadra River reveals that it was an inhabited place since the Stone Age . Many places of this district have legendary history. The history of the district is divided into four periods, from  Badami Chalukya  till the Muslim invasion. Gona Ganna Reddy  ruled Nandi vardhamana puram by making capital.its near Village of Nagarkurnool.  Gona Ganna Reddy  was the secret agent of Rani Rudrama Devi.

Early Western  Chalukya  period lasting from about A.D. 535 to about A.D.757. Rastrakuta period from A.D. 757 to A.D.973.and eruva  cholas  also ruled. The River Krishna was southern boundary for  Kakatiya Empire  and later was under Deccan sultanates.

Geography 

Geography and climate 

It has an average elevation of 458 metres (1503 feet).It is settled in the central Deccan Plateau and northern part of Nallamalla Hills made up of granite rocks and hill formations. Most of the region is occupied by Deccan thorn scrub forests and Central Deccan Plateau dry deciduous forests towards the southern region of the district. The region falls under semi arid climate which left the region barren making the cultivation dependent on seasonal rainfall.
Krishna river flows from southern border of district and additionally the district has many interlinked chains of lakes and ponds that drain into "Dindubi" river. Located in the semi-arid region of Telangana, Nagarkurnool has a predominantly hot and dry climate. Summer starts in March, and peak in May with average high temperatures in the  range. 
A dry, mild winter starts in October and lasts until early February, when there is little humidity and average temperatures in the  range. Many hill rocks and lakes are located throughout district.

Demographics 
 Census of India, the district has a population of 893,308.

Administrative divisions 
The district has four revenue divisions of Achampet, Nagarkurnool, Kalwakurthy and Kollapur and is sub-divided into 20 mandals. Sri P Uaday Kumar IAS is the present collector of the district.

Economy

Transport

Roadway 
There are two national highways that connect the district, NH765 Hyderabad to Srisailam connects Kalwakurthy town and Mannanur village in Nallamala hills and runs through the forests of Amrabad to reach srisailam. NH167 Bellary to Kodad connects Kalwakurthy with Mahaboobnagar, Jadcherla to the west and Devarakonda towards the east. SH20 starts from Mahboobnagar connects Nagarkurnool, Achampet to join NH765 at foothills of Nallamala.
A proposed new national highway 167k from Hyderabad to Nandyal is expected to connect towns of Kalwakurthy, Nagarkurnool and Kollapur with Atmakur, Nandyal in Nandyal district of Andhra Pradhesh.

The district is well connected within neighbor towns and cities by bus. TSRTC operates bus services from 4 major towns of Nagarkurnool, Kalwakurthy, Achampet and Kollapur with nearby villages and major towns such as Hyderabad, Mahaboobnagar, Wanaparthy and Kurnool.

Railway 
There are no railway lines in the district, the nearest railway station is Jadcherla. A proposed railway line from Gadwal to Macherla that is expected to link Nagarkurnool and Kalwakurthy towns of the district, However, the project is on due for approval for several years.

Tourism 
The Telangana State Tourism Development Corporation is a state government agency identified and developed several places of Interest throughout the district.

Religious Tourism

 Umamaheshwaram
 Saleswaram
 Lalitha Someswara Swamy Temple
 Sri Madanagopalaswamy Temple
 Lakshmi Narasimhaswamy Temple
 Nandeeswara shaneeswara Temple
 Ramagiri Temple

Eco Tourism

The forest regions from southern boundaries of district are part of Nagarjunsagar-Srisailam Tiger Reserve, Telangana Tourism developed Jungle safari and trek at Farahbad forest checkpoint and also developed Riverfront cottages at River Krishna near Eegalapenta towards Srisailam. The backwaters of Krishna river from srisailam reservoir at Somasila are developed under state Eco-tourism Package with cottages, river cruising and trekking activities at foothills of Nallamala.

See also 
 List of districts in Telangana

References

External links 
 Official website

 
Districts of Telangana